World U20 Records in the sport of athletics are ratified by World Athletics. Athletics records comprise the best performance of an athlete before the year of their 20th birthday.  Technically, in all under 20 age divisions, the age is calculated "on December 31 of the year of competition" to avoid age group switching during a competitive season. These age category records were formerly referred to as world junior records.

Outdoor

Key:

h = hand timing

a = automatic timing

+ = en route to longer distance

# = not officially ratified by World Athletics

X = unratified due to inadequate doping control

OT = oversized track (> 200m in circumference)

Men

Women

Mixed

Indoor

Men

Women

Notes

References

External links
World Athletics: World U20 Records

Junior
World